This is a list of members of the People's Representative Council of the United States of Indonesia. The legislature existed only for a brief period during the existence of the federal state, and had 151 members, based on the amount of each constituent state. The largest state, the Republic of Indonesia, has 50 members, while smaller states such as Bangka, Belitung, Riau, Great Dayak, Southeast Borneo, and East Kalimantan, has only two members.

In addition to the states, there were also representatives of two cities, Sabang and Kotawaringin, each having one members in the council. European minorities were also represented in the council with four members.

Unless stated, all members were inaugurated on 17 February 1950.

Speakers and Deputy Speakers

List

References

Bibliography 
 

Lists of political office-holders in Indonesia